Collège catholique Samuel-Genest (CCSG) is a French Catholic junior high and high school  in Ottawa, Ontario, Canada, under the Conseil des écoles catholiques du Centre-Est (CECCE). Both junior high and high school sides were combined in 2004 with the fusion of the CCSG (high school) with the junior high schools of Pauline-Vanier and Vision Jeunesse (both in Ottawa, ON). A school uniform is mandatory for the students.

History
In September 1979, CCSG opened with 71 students, in two classes of Grade 9 and one class of Grade 10. The administration, knowing that students want to follow their high school education at Samuel-Genest, created Grade 11 classes the next year, and a Grade 12 class in 1982. It was only in 1984 however that a Grade 13 was offered.

Throughout those years, Samuel-Genest has moved from three different locations in Ottawa. First starting on Smyth Rd., then to Church St and finally on Carson's Rd.

Concentrations

Concentration Scientifique
CCSG is known for its academic strength in the field of Science and offers a selection of enriched science courses to its students from 9th to 12th grade. It is the only high-school in the Ottawa region to offer a Concentration Scientifique (French for Scientific concentration).

7th & 8th grade concentrations
In the 2006–2007 school year, the school also launched 2 new programs, exclusively to Grades 7–8, which are Sam'Artiste, an arts program, and Sam'Sportif, a sports program, in addition to the Sam'Enrichit program, which offers enriched courses with additional subjects.
It is expected that the Sam'Artiste and Sportif programs will be gradually expanded to Grades 9–12.{cn}

Additionally, the school offers a precursor to the "Concentration Scientifique" known as the Pré-Concentration Scientifique, offered to students in the 7th and 8th grades.

See also
List of high schools in Ontario

References

External links

 Official Web site of the school 
 Web site of the school board 
 Association des anciens du Collège Catholique Samuel-Genest 

High schools in Ottawa
French-language schools in Ottawa
French-language high schools in Ontario
Catholic secondary schools in Ontario
Educational institutions established in 1979
1979 establishments in Ontario
Middle schools in Ottawa